The 1997–98 Copa Federación de España was the fifth staging of the Copa Federación de España, a knockout competition for Spanish football clubs in Segunda División B and Tercera División.

The Regional stages began in 1997, while the national tournament took place from November 1997 to April 1998.

Regional tournaments

Asturias tournament

Source:

Castile and León tournament

|}

National tournament

Preliminary round

|}

Round of 16

|}

Quarter-finals

|}

Semifinals

|}

Final

|}

References

External links
1993–99 Copa Federación results

Copa Federación de España seasons